TAP Digital Media Ventures Corporation (TAP DMV) is a Philippine media and entertainment company which oversees the operations of its 24-hour linear television channels and a digital over-the-top media service. It is founded by Renen and Celinda De Guia (owners of live events company Ovation Productions) and former Solar Entertainment Corporation chief operating officer Peter Chan Liong.

TAP DMV owns 8 pay television channels and has programming/coverage rights agreement with international broadcasters such as Comcast (NBCUniversal, Peacock, Sky Group), ITV Studios and DAZN Group.

History
TAP DMV was founded on February 1, 2018. It launched EDGEsport Philippines on the same year under a branding license agreement from its owner IMG. It aired action-centric and combat sports.

In July 2021, TAP DMV signed a licensing rights with Filipino boxing icon Manny Pacquiao to secure exclusive broadcast rights of his recently concluded bout against Yordenis Ugas via its own cable channels. In August 2021, TAP DMV was awarded the local rights to the 2020 Summer Paralympics games.

Assets

Channels

Current channels
 TAP Edge - Drama-centric entertainment channel. It airs canned shows from the U.S. focusing on action and crime/suspense drama series, and news/current affairs. Formerly a dedicated EDGEsport and other action sports programming channel.
 TAP TV - Lifestyle and general entertainment channel. It airs canned shows from the U.S. focusing on variety and talk shows, reality drama, and movies. The channel was originally a female-centric sports channel known as TAP Sports 2 and later TAP W.
 TAP Movies - All-movie channel. It airs mainstream Hollywood films from Universal Pictures and other film studios. It was Launched in October 2021.
 TAP Action Flix - dedicated movie channel which currently airs action, crime and thriller movies. It was launched in October 2021.
 TAP Sports - 24-hour sports channel. Formerly known as TAP Sports 1, the channel carries a variety of sporting events such as the Euroleague, National Basketball League (Australia), Golden Boy Promotions, and WWE among others.
 Premier Sports - Complimentary channel of the TAP Sports network. The channel will air top-notching international sport events from UFC, NFL, Formula One, UEFA, and AEW among others. It was launched in October 2021.
 Premier Sports 2 - Counterpart channel to Premier Sports. It broadcasts all of the PGA Tour and WTA tournaments throughout the year, as well as rugby union and athletics. The channel was originally a dedicated tennis channel known as Premier Tennis where it broadcast ATP and WTA tournaments.
 Premier Football - Dedicated football (soccer) channel. It broadcasts selected coverages of international football leagues, including the Premier League, Eredivisie, the Scottish Professional Football League, and others.

Former channels
 EDGEsport Philippines
 Premier Tennis
 TAP Sports 1
 TAP Sports 2
 TAP W

TAP Go
TAP Go is TAP DMV's official over-the-top (OTT) app and browser-based subscription service which allows users to stream Live TV Channels and Video On Demand content over the internet. It contains livestreaming of the company's cable channels and selected live sporting events, restricted to Philippine territory only. In November 2020, TAP Go suspended its operations indefinitely to give way for system maintenance, although its sister site (PremierFootball.ph) continues to operate. The service was resumed on August 14, 2021.

TapGo is available to download on IOS Devices through App Store and Android Devices through Google Play. It can also be accessed through web browser on http://tapgo.tv.

References

 
Companies based in Mandaluyong
Television networks in the Philippines
Mass media companies of the Philippines
Entertainment companies of the Philippines
Mass media companies established in 2018
Philippine companies established in 2018
Privately held companies